is a hybrid physical and digital collectible card game for the arcade, on the Chihiro arcade board. It is a real-time strategy-based game set in the Three Kingdoms period of Chinese history and the 14th century Chinese novel Romance of the Three Kingdoms by Luo Guanzhong. It uses the same housing as World Club Champion Football, with a sensitive playing area that can detect the position of the physical cards. Over 500 million trading cards have been shipped. It is the sixth trading card arcade game by Sega, following World Club Champion Football, Mushiking: The King of Beetles, The Key of Avalon, Love and Berry: Dress up and Dance! and Quest of D.

Gameplay system
Two opponents are on the opposite ends of a battlefield, with the goal of attacking the enemy's castle until the timer runs out. The game ends if the castle is destroyed or if the time runs out. The player that has more health wins. Before the match, the player builds a deck that can vary heavily in playstyle, depending which troops and factions are chosen. Up to 8 points are allotted to the team, and one card can take up to 3 points.

Version history
The first version of Sangokushi Taisen was launched 2005 with a 2.0 version following in 2006 and the 3.0 version releasing in 2007. The 3.0 version was released on the Lindbergh arcade platform, and in addition to being available in Japan, it was also released in Shanghai, Taiwan, South Korea, Hong Kong and Singapore. A version called 3.59 WAR BEGINS launched 2010 and also was a wider Asian release. A completely new game, Sengoku Taisen, also was launched 2010, only in Japan. It had a different scenario set in feudal Japan and the arcade platform switched to RingEdge. Sangokushi Taisen 4 launched 2016 on the Nu2 arcade platform, available in Japan & Hong Kong. Eiketsu Taisen, combining both the feudal Japan and Three Kingdoms scenarios, released 2022 on the ALLS UX platform.

Outside of the arcade, Sangokushi Taisen DS was published by Sega in 2007 for the Nintendo DS. It was based on version 2.0 of the arcade game. Sangokushi Taisen Ten was based on version 3.0 and released on the following year also for the Nintendo DS. Sangokushi Taisen INFINITY ONLINE was a PC Windows version launched in 2011 by GameCyber Technology Limited in Hong Kong. The Sangokushi Taisen Trading Card Game - based on the game, released in 2012. The CCG was localized as War of Three Kingdoms: The Card Game.

A blockchain-based version of the game was announced in September 2022, in partnership with developer Double Jump Tokyo.

Development 
The producer wanted to develop a game based on the Romance of the Three Kingdoms ever since he joined Sega. By 2003, the situation of arcades changed dramatically with internet connection and IC cards that save progress, and with the addition of flat panel reader of World Club Champion Football, it was decided that now was the right time to launch a game based on the Romance of the Three Kingdoms. Rather than being a grand strategy game like the Koei Tecmo series Romance of the Three Kingdoms or Sega's own Total War, the game's producer compared the game to Virtua Fighter, in the sense that it is competetive fighting game between two players.

Reception 
NintendoLife reviewed the Nintendo DS version of the game positively, lamenting the fact that despite the game continued success in arcades, no versions for Wii U or Nintendo 3DS followed. The game was cited one of the influences for the battle system of Final Fantasy XIII.

References

External links
  

Card games introduced in 2005
Video games based on Romance of the Three Kingdoms
Real-time tactics video games
Sega Games franchises
Arcade video games
Collectible card games